Richard Cyril "Rip" Sullivan, Jr. (born March 14, 1959) is an American activist serving as a member of the Virginia House of Delegates from the 48th district, which encompasses parts of Arlington and Fairfax counties. Sullivan is a member of the Democratic Party.

Background

Sullivan and his future wife Beth graduated from Langley High School in 1977. After graduating magna cum laude from Amherst College in 1981, he earned a Juris Doctor degree from the University of Virginia School of Law in 1987.

Sullivan has practiced law in Northern Virginia for nearly 30 years, most notably with law firm Reed Smith LLP. Following his election, Sullivan left Reed Smith and joined the Arlington-based firm of Bean Kinney & Korman.

Prior to becoming a lawyer, Sullivan helped create the United States Institute of Peace. Sullivan currently serves on the Chairman's Advisory Board of the Institute. He has served on numerous local, regional, and statewide boards and commissions.

Sullivan is the former president of Northern Virginia Legal Services, an organization that provides free counsel to low-income residents.

In 2020, Sullivan introduced and helped pass the Virginia Clean Economy Act, which was signed into law on April 11, 2020.

Political career

2007 campaign
The 34th district race was one of the most expensive local campaigns in Virginia in 2007 because of Vince Callahan's political influence in Richmond. The race was targeted as a prime pickup opportunity by the Virginia Democratic Party. Democrat Margaret Vanderhye, a community activist from McLean, Virginia, announced her candidacy along with Sullivan in the Democratic primary. In the primary election on June 12, 2007, Vanderhye defeated Sullivan by 149 votes, according to the State Board of Elections. Vanderhye went on to win the general election, but was defeated in 2009 by Republican Barbara Comstock.

2014 campaign
On June 29, 2014, Rip announced his candidacy for a special election for Virginia's 48th House of Delegates district to fill the seat of longtime Delegate Robert Brink, who resigned to take a job in the McAuliffe administration. On July 6, Sullivan won a firehouse primary over six other candidates to become the Democratic nominee for the seat. On August 19, Sullivan won in a landslide victory over opponent Dave Foster, winning by more than 24 points and winning every single precinct in the 48th District.

Electoral history

References

External links
Official Campaign Website
2007 Campaign Finance Data
Raising Kaine Interview

People from McLean, Virginia
Amherst College alumni
University of Virginia School of Law alumni
Virginia lawyers
Living people
1959 births
21st-century American politicians
Democratic Party members of the Virginia House of Delegates